Unione Calcio Padova, also known as Gamma 3 Padova or A.C.F. Padova, is a former Italian women's football who played in Serie A Femminile and Serie B Femminile.

Honours

National titles
Serie A:
Winners (2) : 1972, 1973
Runners-up (3): 1974, 1975, 1977

Coppa Italia:
Winners (1) : 1974

Former international players
  Susanne Augustesen
  Conchi Sánchez

References

Women's football clubs in Italy
Serie A (women's football) clubs